In enzymology, an oligosaccharide-diphosphodolichol diphosphatase is an enzyme that catalyzes the chemical reaction

oligosaccharide-diphosphodolichol + H2O  oligosaccharide phosphate + dolichyl phosphate

Thus, the two substrates of this enzyme are oligosaccharide-diphosphodolichol and H2O, whereas its two products are oligosaccharide phosphate and dolichyl phosphate.

This enzyme belongs to the family of hydrolases, specifically those acting on acid anhydrides in phosphorus-containing anhydrides.  The systematic name of this enzyme class is oligosaccharide-diphosphodolichol phosphodolichohydrolase. This enzyme is also called oligosaccharide-diphosphodolichol pyrophosphatase.

References

 

EC 3.6.1
Enzymes of unknown structure